Pir Anbar (also Romanized as Pīr Anbār; also known as Pīr Ambāi and Pīrdwbār) is a village in Sardaran Rural District, in the Central District of Kabudarahang County, Hamadan Province, Iran. At the 2006 census, its population was 689, in 153 families.

References 

Populated places in Kabudarahang County